The following is a list of stadiums in New Zealand, ordered by capacity. Currently stadiums with a capacity of at least 5,000 are included. It is actually difficult to account for accuracy here as many grounds use temporary stands, there is much use of standing only embankments and not often are grounds full to enable gauging accuracy. We can only rely on what is stated publicly. Also some grounds add extra capacity on rare occasions for major matches; Waikato can add 5,000 over a closed off bordering road. Yarrow has had to close its stands due to earthquake risks. QBE is to get a refurbished reduction. Owen Delany is in a rural area and gets rare serious games. Trafalgar was expanded once to 20,000 for a one of test match. And Christchurch is about to be replaced with an identical ground to Dunedin - which is New Zealand's only covered outdoor stadium.

An asterisk indicates that the tenant only uses the venue for some of the matches.

See also
List of Oceanian stadiums by capacity
List of indoor arenas in New Zealand

New Zealand
 Stadiums